Progress in the area of prevention is formulated in an environment of beliefs, called  paradigms as can be seen in the next table. Some of them can be referred to as professional folklore, i.e. a widely supported set of beliefs with no real basis. For example, the “accident-prone driver” was a belief that was supported by the data in the sense that a small number of drivers do participate in a disproportionate number of accidents, it follows that the identification and removal of this drivers will reduce crashes. A more scientific analysis of the data indicate that this phenomenon can be explained simply by the random nature of the accidents, and not for a specific error-prone attitude of such drivers.

From: OECD Road Transport Research

National programs

A prerequisite for progress in this area is to introduce national programs with clear and quantifiable objectives, some examples are:
Chile 0% growth in fatalities, (down from historical 5-7% annual growth), (CONASET, 1993)
EU, 40% reduction in fatalities for 2010
Denmark 40% reduction for 2000
Finland 65% reduction for 2005
United Kingdom 33% reduction for 2000
United States No more than 1.0 fatality for every 100 million vehicle miles traveled (VMT) by 2008

Sweden has developed a new concept to improve road safety called "Vision Zero".
Vision Zero is conceived from the ethical base that it can never be acceptable that people are killed or seriously injured when moving within the road transport system. It centres around an explicit goal, and develops into a highly pragmatic and scientifically based strategy which challenges the traditional approach to road safety.

Vision Zero: strategic principles
The traffic system has to adapt to take better account of the needs, mistakes and vulnerabilities of road users.
The level of violence that the human body can tolerate without being killed or seriously injured forms the basic parameter in the design of the road transport system.
Vehicle speed is the most important regulating factor for a safe road traffic. It should be determined by the technical standard of both roads and vehicle so as not to exceed the level of violence that the human body can tolerate.

While the concept envisages responsibility for safety amongst the designers and users of the system, the designer has the final responsibility for "fail-safe" measures.

Vision Zero: system designer has primary responsibility
System designers are responsible for the design, operation and the use of the road transport system and are thereby responsible for the level of safety within the entire system.
Road users are responsible for following the rules for using the road transport system set by the system designers.
If the users fail to comply with these rules due to a lack of knowledge, acceptance or ability, the system designers are required to take the necessary further steps to counteract people being killed or injured.

Management systems

Modern Road Safety makes a distinction between the situation and the management systems necessary to control it, with prevention activities that largely exceeds the self-evident fields of the traditional 3 E (Engineering, Enforcement, Education) approach, first introduced in 1925. Modern Management systems have the aims of be inclusive, i.e. to include explicitly all activities part of such system. Forming an integrated whole

The more extensive effort to obtain a comprehensive, holistic design of a road safety system, with the direct participation of 123 persons, representatives of different areas of activities, was done in Chile, (CONASET, 1993), utilizing the methodology for the design of social systems developed by Del Valle (1992). The result was the design of the control apparatus for this situation, called “Road Safety System”, defined by its components. An informal test of its completeness can be done simply by consider this management system without any of its components, for example if we remove rescue we simply lose opportunities to save human life coming from activities in this area. It can be used as an outline to assess the completeness of national road safety programs.

Please note than the following table is a systems definition i.e. it is supposed that is parts form an integrated whole.

Semantics
The field of Road safety is handicapped by the terminology. Words have power to them that conveys impressions as well as meanings, phenomena that in this case results in sub-optimal approaches to prevention, as follows:

Road safety
The name “Road safety” have conveyed that in this field the activities need to concentrate on items that properly belong to roads and, by extension, to the roads authorities, keeping a reduced scope of activities in a number of different areas, in spite of their potentially significant contributions. For example, in the UK, Burrough, (1991) indicates that only one-third of the target reduction will be delivered by road safety engineering measures while Koornstra ( 2002) indicates “The contribution of local road engineering to the fatality reductions between 1980 and 2000 are estimated to be 4% for Sweden, 10% for Britain, and 5% for the Netherlands”. Whereas TEC (2003), quotes a research from the Imperial College, London that indicates than the progress in medical technology and care made a significant contribution to the 45% fall of fatalities during the last 20 years, and account for 700 lives saved annually in the UK, and further puts forward that the lack of consideration of the benefits coming from the medical area, suggests that road safety is probably less effective that thought. It is remarkable that implicitly the author of the research doesn't consider medical activities as a component of a road safety management system.

It reflects confusion between the space where this phenomenon occurs (mainly roads) and the design of the Management systems to control it, in what “Roads” is only a 11% of the activities (one area out of nine in previous table).

Accident
The use of the word “accident” with its connotations of being and unavoidable event, weaken the resolve to intervene in order to reduce crashes and the resulting harm. Evans (1991) argues that the word “crash” indicates in a simple factual way what is observed, while “Accident” seems to suggest in addition a general explanation of why it occurred.

Cause of accidents
Road safety recognizes that crashes, and their consequences, are multifactor events, Ogden (1996) indicates: “An approach based in notions of cause and blame is simplistic in the extreme”. In short, crashes have  factors  not  causes .

Problem-solving
Old approaches emphasize the concept of   problem-solving  in Road safety, but it is more correct to recognize that Road safety activities doesn't solve problems. For instance, when a safer road design is implemented, hopefully the number of crashes, or their seriousness, will go down, but they will not disappear. It is more correct to say the implementation of correct policies, programs and measures will reduce numbers or consequences of crashes, but they will no be ´´solved´´.

This realization is important, because it changes the focus from a problem that will go away if we devote enough resources to it, to a situation requiring on-going management. This management in turn requires the development of scientifically based techniques, witch will enable us to predict with confidence that safety resources are well-spent and likely to be effective.

See also
Road safety
Traffic psychology
Work-related road safety in the United States
Haddon Matrix

References
 Ashton, S. J. and G.M. Mackay (1979) Some Characteristics of the Population who Suffer Trauma as Pedestrians When Hit by Cars and Some Resulting Implications, 4th IRCOBI International Conference, Gothenburg.
 Burrough P. Procedure for the Road Safety Audit of Truck Roads Schemes. 10p. (UK Department of Transportation, London)
 CONASET 1993, Política Nacional de Seguridad de Tránsito. Comisión Nacional de Seguridad de Tránsito, Chile 1993.
 Del Valle, Alfredo, 1992. Innovative planning for development: An action-oriented approach. University of Pennsylvania, 1992.
 Evans, L. (1991) Older drivers risks to themselves and to other road users. Transportation Research Record 1325, 34-41. Transportation Research Board, Washington, D.C.
 Koornstra, 2002. SUNflower: A comparative study of the development of road safety in Sweden, the United Kingdom, and the Netherlands Matthijs Koornstra (SWOV), David Lynam (TRL), Göran Nilsson (VTI), Piet Noordzij (SWOV), Hans-Erik Pettersson (VTI), Fred Wegman (SWOV), and Peter Wouters (SWOV). SWOV, 2002. http://www.swov.nl/rapport/Sunflower/Sunflower.pdf
 Murray CJL, Lopez AD, eds. The global burden of disease: a comprehensive assessment of mortality and disability from diseases, injuries, and risk factors in 1990 and projected to 2020. Boston, Harvard University Press, 1996.
 Nader, Ralph, Unsafe at any speed; the designed-in dangers of the American automobile
 Ogden, K. W., 1996 SAFER ROADS, A guide to road safety engineering. Ashgate Publishing Limited.
 OECD Road Transport Research: Outlook 2000. CHAPTER V: ROAD SAFETY, (1997 ) Table V.1 Page. 17 
 OECD Economic Evaluation of Road Safety Measures (2000).
 Ogden, K. W., 1996 SAFER ROADS, A guide to road safety engineering. Ashgate Publishing Limited.
 Silcock, David. Preventing death and injury on the world's roads. Transport Reviews, Volume 23 Number 3, July–September 2003.
 TEC 2003. Traffic Engineering & Control June 2003, page 200. Hemming Group.

External links
Road Safety Management System -   a successful system from a developing country
VISION ZERO
World first car death

Automotive safety
Road safety